René Rouffeteau (30 March 1926 – 27 April 2012) was a French cyclist. He competed in the individual and team road race events at the 1948 Summer Olympics.

References

External links
René Rouffeteau's obituary 
 

1926 births
2012 deaths
French male cyclists
Cyclists at the 1948 Summer Olympics
Olympic cyclists of France
Sportspeople from Saint-Denis, Seine-Saint-Denis
Cyclists from Île-de-France